Rai Bahadur Sir Ganga Ram  (born Ganga Ram Agarwal; 13 April 1851 – 10 July 1927) was an Indian civil engineer and architect. His extensive contributions to the urban fabric of Lahore, then in colonial India and now in modern Pakistan, caused Khaled Ahmed to describe him as  "the father of modern Lahore".

Early life

Ganga Ram Agarwal was born on 13 April 1851 in Mangtanwala, a village in Sheikhupura District in the Punjab Province of British India (now in the Nankana Sahib District of Punjab, Pakistan) into a Punjabi Hindu Baniya family of the Agarwal clan. His father, Doulat Ram Agarwal, was a junior subinspector at a police station in Mangtanwala. Later, he shifted to Amritsar and became a copy-writer of the court. Here, Ganga Ram passed his matriculation examination from the Government High School and joined the Government College, Lahore in 1869. In 1871, he obtained a scholarship to the Thomason Civil Engineering College at Roorkee. He passed the final lower subordinate examination with the gold medal in 1873. He was appointed assistant engineer and called to Delhi to help in the building of the Imperial Assemblage.

Career

Engineer

In 1873, after a brief Service in Punjab P.W.D devoted himself to practical farming. He obtained, on lease from the government,  of barren, unirrigated land in Montgomery District, and within three years converted that vast desert into smiling fields, irrigated by water lifted by a hydroelectric plant and running through a thousand miles of irrigation channels, all constructed at his own cost. This was the biggest private enterprise of the kind, unknown and unthought-of in the country before. Sir Ganga Ram earned millions most of which he gave to charity.

In the words of Sir Malcolm Hailey, the Governor of Punjab, "he won like a hero and gave like a Saint". He was a great engineer and a great philanthropist.

In 1900, Ganga Ram was selected by Lord Curzon to act as superintendent of works in the Imperial Durbar to be held in connection with the accession of King Edward VII. He finished the work at the Darbar managing its manifold problems and challenges. He retired prematurely from service in 1903.

He received the title of Rai Bahadur in 1903, and was appointed a Companion of the Order of the Indian Empire (CIE) on 26 June 1903 for his services at the Delhi Durbar. On 12 December 1911, in a special honours list after the 1911 Delhi Durbar, he was appointed a Member Fourth Class (present-day Lieutenant) of the Royal Victorian Order (MVO). He was knighted in the 1922 Birthday Honours list, and on 8 July was personally invested with his honour at Buckingham Palace by the King-Emperor George V.

He designed and built General Post Office, Lahore, Lahore Museum, Aitchison College, Mayo School of Arts (now the National College of Arts), Ganga Ram Hospital, Lahore 1921, Lady Mclagan Girls High School, the chemistry department of the Government College University, the Albert Victor wing of Mayo Hospital, Sir Ganga Ram High School (now Lahore College for Women), the Hailey College of Commerce (now Hailey College of Banking & Finance), Ravi Road House for the Disabled, the Ganga Ram Trust Building on "The Mall" and Lady Maynard Industrial School. He also constructed Model Town and Gulberg town, once the best localities of Lahore, the powerhouse at Renala Khurd as well as the railway track between Pathankot and Amritsar. 

After the partition of India and Pakistan, another hospital Sir Ganga Ram Hospital, New Delhi was built in 1951 in his memory.

Service in Patiala State

He became Superintending Engineer in Patiala State for the capital's reconstruction project after his retirement. Amongst his works were Moti Bagh Palace, Secretariat Building, New Delhi, Victoria Girls School, the law courts and police station.

In Tehsil Jaranwala of district Lyallpur (now Faisalabad), Ganga Ram built a unique travelling facility, Ghoda Train (horse pulled train). It was a railway line from Buchiana Railway station (on Lahore Jaranwala railway line) to the village of Gangapur. It remained in use for decades even after Independence. It became useless for need of repair in 1980s. It was unique of its kind. It was two simple trollies pulled on a narrow rail track with horse instead of railway engine.

The same was resumed in 2010 by the Faisalabad District Authorities giving it a status of cultural heritage.

Agriculturalist
He was a promising agriculturist, too. He took more than 20,000 acres of land on lease from the Government near Renala and cultivated it by completely irrigating the barren land with hydro-electric pumping. He purchased thousands acres of barren land in Lyallpur on lease and by using engineering skills and modern irrigation methods, turned the arid lands into fertile fields.  He established a Maynard-Ganga Ram award of Rs 3000 with a Rs 25000 endowment. The award was to be made every three years for anyone who made an innovation that increased agricultural production in Punjab.

Death

He died in London on 10 July 1927. His body was cremated and his ashes were brought back to India. A portion of the ashes were consigned to Ganges River and the rest buried in Lahore on the bank of the Ravi River.

Sir Ganga Ram in literature
A marble statue of Sir Ganga Ram once stood in a public square on Mall Road in Lahore. Famous Urdu writer Saadat Hasan Manto wrote a satire on persons who were trying to obliterate any memory of any Hindu in Lahore during Partition riots. In his satirical story "The Garland,” set during the religious riots of 1947, an inflamed mob in Lahore, after attacking a residential area, turned to attacking the statue of Sir Ganga Ram, the great Lahori Hindu philanthropist of Lahore. They first pelted the statue with stones; then smothered its face with coal tar. Then a man made a garland of old shoes climbed up to put it round the neck of the statue. The police arrived and opened fire. Among the injured was the fellow with the garland of old shoes. As he fell, the mob shouted: “Let us rush him to Sir Ganga Ram Hospital” forgetting that ironically they were trying to obliterate the memory of the very person who had founded the hospital where the person was to be taken for saving his life.

Legacy

A student hostel, Ganga Bhawan was established at IIT Roorkee (erstwhile University of Roorkee and Thomason college of civil engineering) on 26 November 1957 in his honour.
 The Sir Ganga Ram Hospital in Lahore, Pakistan was partially damaged in the blasts that destroyed a nearby Police Station on 27 May 2009.

Today, his family through his sons and daughters reside across the world. Some of whom include Indu Vira, great-grandson and also son of Dharma Vira the founder of the Sir Ganga Ram Hospital in New Delhi. His other great-grandson, Dr. Ashwin Ram is an Associate Professor in the School of Interactive computing in the College of Computing of the Georgia Institute of Technology, while his great-granddaughter, Shreela Flather, Baroness Flather, is a teacher and British politician.

Works

Named after Ram

Institutes
 Sir Ganga Ram Hospital (India)
 Sir Ganga Ram Hospital (Pakistan)

Places
 Gangapur, Punjab, Pakistan
 Sir Ganga Ram's home, Punjab, Pakistan

References

Further reading
 Bedi, Baba Pyare Lal, Harvest from the desert. The life and work of Sir Ganga Ram, NCA, Lahore 2003 ISBD 969-8623-07-8 (reprint version)

1851 births
1927 deaths
Punjabi people
Indian Hindus
Punjabi Hindus
Bania communities
Agrawal
Aggarwal
Engineers from Lahore
Indian philanthropists
People from British India
Indian Knights Bachelor
Knights Bachelor
Companions of the Order of the Indian Empire
Indian Members of the Royal Victorian Order
People from Nankana Sahib District
People from Punjab Province (British India)
Indian people in rail transport
Rai Bahadurs
Businesspeople in agriculture
People from Lahore